Bad Seeds is a Canadian animated short film, written, directed and animated by Claude Cloutier for the National Film Board of Canada. The short had its international premiere at the Annecy International Animation Film Festival, and won  multiple awards for Best Animated Short Film in Calgary International Film Festival and the 2021 New York City Short Film Festival and the Sommets du cinéma d'animation. The film was shortlisted for the Academy Award for Best Animated Short Film for the 94th Academy Awards.

Plot 
Bad Seeds depicts a surreal modern-day fable where two carnivorous plants, who can change shape like chameleons change colours, would rather fight over flies than work together to survive. Growth is intertwined with rivalry; evolution with competition, resulting in a startling conflict littered with references to historical figures, popular culture, board games, and more.

Accolades

References

External links 
 

2021 films
2021 animated films
2021 short films
Canadian animated short films
National Film Board of Canada animated short films
Films directed by Claude Cloutier
2020s Canadian films